Still Life with Mirror is a lithograph by the Dutch artist M. C. Escher which was created in 1934. The reflection of the mirror mingles together two completely unrelated spaces and  introduces the outside world of the small town narrow street in Abruzzi, Villalago, into internal world of the bedroom.  This  work of Escher  is closely related to his later application of mirror effect in 1937 Still Life and Street. Escher manipulates the scale in different parts of the print to achieve the effect of smooth connection between worlds.

References

Works by M. C. Escher
1934 works
Lithography
Still life paintings